Wikmani poisid is a semi-autobiographical novel by Estonian writer Jaan Kross, published in 1988.

A TV-series based on the novel was produced in 1994.

References

Estonian novels
1988 novels
Autobiographical novels
Novels adapted into television shows